The men's C-1 1000 metres was a competition in canoeing at the 1956 Summer Olympics. The C-1 event is raced by single-man sprint canoes. The final took place on December 1.

Medalists

Final
Ten competitors entered, but one withdrew prior to the event. With only nine competitors, a final was held.

References

1956 Summer Olympics official report. p. 407.
Sports-reference.com 1956 C-1 1000 m results

Men's C-1 1000
Men's events at the 1956 Summer Olympics